Wolfgang Schmidt (born 16 January 1954) is a German former track and field athlete who competed for East Germany at the 1976 Summer Olympics and won the silver medal in the discus throw. A former world record holder, he also won several medals at the European Athletics Championships. Schmidt made headlines in 1982 due to his failed attempt to escape from East Germany. He later competed for the Federal Republic of Germany and won third place in the 1990 European Athletics Championships. Born in Berlin, he competed for the SC Dynamo Berlin / Sportvereinigung (SV) Dynamo.

Athletic achievements

 1973: European Junior Championships: first place in discus (61.30)
 1974: European Championships: eighth place in discus (59.56)
 1976: Olympic Games: second place in discus (63.68 – foul – 65.16 – foul – 63.96 – 66.22)
 1978: European Championships: first place in discus (64.04 – 61.68 – 64.52 – 62.08 – 65.94 – 66.82); third place in shot put (19.86 – 19.63 – 19.92 – 19.62 – 20.30 – 19.49)
 1980: Olympic Games: fourth place in discus (65.64)
 1990: European Championships: third place in discus (61.28 – 60.84 – foul – 64.08 – 64.10 – foul), competing for West Germany.
 1991: World Championships: fourth place in discus (64.76)

His personal best throw was 71.16 metres, achieved in August 1978 in Berlin. This ranks him third among German discus throwers, only behind Jürgen Schult and Lars Riedel.

Flight from East Germany
After a disappointing fourth-place finish at the 1980 Olympics and missing the 1981 World Cup in Rome due to a second-place finish in the East German Championships, Schmidt decided to pursue athletic success in the West.

He was constantly under surveillance by the Volkspolizei and they uncovered a plan for his escape (aided by discus colleagues Ricky Bruch and Alwin Wagner); in the autumn of 1982, Schmidt was sentenced to one and a half years in prison. However, one year later he was paroled, on the condition he become a coach with SC Dynamo Adlershof, a sports team of the Felix Dzerzhinsky Watch Regiment.

Schmidt filed a departure request so that he could continue his athletic career in the West. At the end of 1987, he was allowed to move to West Germany, though it was already too late to be considered for the 1988 Olympic Games in Seoul.  After the first track competition between East and West Germany, Jürgen Schult, having won the discus throw, refused to shake hands with Schmidt.

Life after political turmoil
In 1992 Schmidt unseated Jürgen Schult as the German champion in the discus throw. He competed in the qualification meets for the 1992 Olympic Games in Barcelona, but was not considered for the German Olympic team (rival Jürgen Schult was chosen and went on to win the silver medal). Schmidt later moved to San Francisco and became a stockbroker and management consultant.

In East Germany, Schmidt competed for SV Dynamo and trained with Joachim Spenke. He later competed for LG VfB Stuttgart and Stuttgarter Kickers. While competing, he was 1.99 meters tall and weighed 115 kg.

References

External links
 
 
 

1954 births
Living people
East German male discus throwers
West German male discus throwers
German male discus throwers
Athletes (track and field) at the 1976 Summer Olympics
Athletes (track and field) at the 1980 Summer Olympics
Olympic athletes of East Germany
Athletes from Berlin
World record setters in athletics (track and field)
European Athletics Championships medalists
Medalists at the 1976 Summer Olympics
Olympic silver medalists for East Germany
Olympic silver medalists in athletics (track and field)
Universiade medalists in athletics (track and field)
Universiade gold medalists for East Germany
Medalists at the 1979 Summer Universiade